Emmanuelle Loyer  (born, 1968) is a French historian, winner of the prix Femina essai 2015 for her biography of Claude Lévi-Strauss.

Professor of Universities, Emmanuelle Loyer teaches contemporary history at Sciences-Po Paris.

Works 
1994: Histoire culturelle et intellectuelle de la France au XXe siècle, with Pascale Goetschel, Paris, Armand Colin, series "Cursus", 187 p. 
1997: Le Théâtre citoyen de Jean Vilar. Une utopie d’après-guerre, Paris, Presses Universitaires de France, 253 p. 
2005: Histoire culturelle de la France de la Belle époque à nos jours, with Pascale Goetschel, Paris, Armand Colin, series "Cursus", 268 p. 
2005: Paris à New York. Intellectuels et artistes français en exil, 1940-1947, Paris, Éditions Grasset and Fasquelle, 497 p. 
- Prix Cazes 2006
2007: Histoire du Festival d’Avignon, with Antoine de Baecque, Paris, Éditions Gallimard, 607 p. 
 - Prix du meilleur livre sur le théâtre du Syndicat de la critique 2007/2008
2008: Mai 68 dans le texte, Paris, Éditions Complexe, series "De source sûre", 343 p. 
2015: Claude Lévi-Strauss, Paris, Flammarion, series "Grandes biographies", 912 p. 
- Prix Femina essai 2015

Contribution to collective works 
 Sous les pavés, la Résistance. La Nouvelle résistance populaire, appropriation et usages de la référence résistante après mai 68, Communication dans les actes du colloque Pourquoi résister ? Résister pour quoi faire?, Centre d'histoire de Sciences Po, CNRS Éditions, 2004.

References

External links 
 Emmanuelle Loyer on Sciences Po centre d'histoire
 Emmanuelle Loyer's resume on Sciences Po
 Emmanuelle LOYER on Non Fiction
 Emmanuelle Loyer reçoit le Prix Femina Essai pour sa biographie de Claude Lévi-Strauss on Les Inrockuptibles (5 November 2015)
 Emmanuelle Loyer on Idées.fr
 Emmanuelle Loyer on France Culture
 Publications de Emmanuelle Loyer on CAIRN

1968 births
Living people
21st-century French women writers
20th-century French women writers
20th-century French historians
French women historians
21st-century French historians
Academic staff of Sciences Po
Prix Femina essai winners